Noi peccatori (i.e. "We, sinners") is a 1953 Italian melodrama film directed by Guido Brignone and starring Yvonne Sanson.

Plot

Cast 

Yvonne Sanson as Lucia
 Steve Barclay as  Stefano 
Tamara Lees as  Fausta 
Carletto Sposito as  Francesco 
Marc Lawrence as  Camillo
Evi Maltagliati as  Lucia's Mother 
 Bella Starace Sainati as  Donna Assunta 
Gualtiero Tumiati as  Don Quirino 
Aldo Silvani as  Don Antonio 
Mario Ferrari as   Rinaldi 
Turi Pandolfini as  Collega
Teresa Franchini as  First Nun
Anita Durante as  Second Nun
 Nino Marchesini as  Hospital Director
Attilio Dottesio as  Doctor
 Sandro Bianchi as Police Commissioner

References

External links

Italian drama films
1953 drama films
Films directed by Guido Brignone
1953 films
Films scored by Renzo Rossellini
Melodrama films
Italian black-and-white films
1950s Italian films
1950s Italian-language films